This is a list of institutions of higher education in Manipur.

Universities
 Central Agricultural University
 Dhanamanjuri University
 Manipur University
 Manipur University of Culture
 Manipur Technical University
National Sports University
 Bir Tikendrajit University

Medical colleges
 Jawaharlal Nehru Institute of Medical Sciences
 Regional Institute of Medical Sciences, Lamphelpat
 Shija Academy of Health Sciences

Technical institutes
 Manipur Institute of Technology
 Indian Institute of Information Technology, Manipur
 National Institute of Technology, Manipur

References

 
Manipur
Education